Imtiaz Abbasi, (born 9 June 1968) is a former Pakistani-born cricketer who played for the United Arab Emirates national cricket team. As a wicket-keeper, Imtiaz Abbasi made his mark in his first-class debut for Karachi against Quetta in the 1988 Patron's Trophy where he held seven catches, a record for domestic Pakistani cricket. However, he did not play another first-class game, and later emigrated to the United Arab Emirates, for whom he first played representative cricket in the 1994 ICC Trophy, where he was declared best wicket-keeper of the competition after claiming 22 dismissals in nine matches. He also kept wickets for the UAE in the 1996 World Cup, where he played in 6 One Day Internationals.

References

External links

1968 births
Living people
People from Poonch District, Pakistan
Pakistani cricketers
Karachi cricketers
Emirati cricketers
United Arab Emirates One Day International cricketers
Pakistani emigrants to the United Arab Emirates
Pakistani expatriate sportspeople in the United Arab Emirates
Wicket-keepers